Korzen may refer to

Surname
Annie Korzen (born in 1938), American actress and writer
Benni Korzen (born in 1938), Danish producer

Places
Korzeń (disambiguation)

See also